WAY-161503 is a full agonist of 5-HT2C receptors (Ki = 3.3 nM for displacement of DOI),  ~6-fold less potent at 5-HT2A receptors (Ki = 18 nM) and 20-fold less potent at 5-HT2B receptors (Ki = 60 nM). In functional studies, it stimulates calcium mobilization coupled to 5-HT2C, 5-HT2B, and 5-HT2A receptors with EC50 values of 0.8, 1.8, and 7 nM, respectively. WAY-161503 has been reported to produce dose-dependent decreases in food intake in 24-hour fasted normal Sprague-Dawley rats, diet-induced obese mice, and obese Zucker rats with ED50 values of 1.9, 6.8, and 0.73 mg/kg, respectively.

WAY-161503 has been used to examine the role of 5-HT2C receptors in rodent models of depression, locomotion, reinforcement, or motivated behaviors.

References 

Anorectics
Lactams
Serotonin receptor agonists
Chloroarenes
Nitrogen heterocycles
Heterocyclic compounds with 3 rings